Suboptimal health status (SHS), or subhealth or sub-health(), can be defined as a state characterized by some disturbances in psychological behaviors or physical characteristics, or in some indices of medical examination, with no typical pathologic features. It is considered as a therapeutic working concept which defines an intermediate stage between health and disease, which is not quite either status. Human persons who are sub-healthy have any of a range of uncomfortable symptoms but without any obvious and diagnosable illnesses which can be identified through standard medical observation methods.  This concept was first presented as "the third state" by the scholar of former Soviet Union, Berkman, in the mid-1980s. It is also interpreted as different terms like "intermediate state", "grey state" or "a general malaise". Sub-health is a term which is widely used by Chinese people, or in connection with traditional Chinese medicine (TCM).

Signs and symptoms
Signs and symptoms considered indicators of SHS include aches, chronic fatigue, indigestion, sleep disorders, congestion, nervousness, distraction, nausea, and poor mood.

Diagnosis
SHS was measured by the suboptimal health questionnaire (SHSQ-25) including 25 items. Each subject was asked to rate a specific statement on a five-point Likert-type scale, based on how often they suffered various specific complaints in the preceding 3 months: (1) never or almost never, (2) occasionally, (3) often, (4) very often, and (5) always. The raw scores of 1 to 5 on the questionnaire were recoded as 0 to 4. SHS scores were calculated for each respondent by summing the ratings for the 25 items. A high score represents a high level of SHS (poor health). The Cronbach’s α coefficient of the SHSQ-25 was 0.91, indicating good internal consistency. The final questionnaire congregated into a score (SHSQ-25) which could significantly distinguish among several abnormal conditions and could be used as a translational medicine instrument for health measuring in the general population.

Another criterion for diagnosis of subhealth was defined as the presence of ≥ 1 of the following abnormalities: body mass index ≥ 25 kg/m2 or waist circumference ≥ 102 cm in men and 88 cm in women; systolic pressure 120-139 mmHg and/or diastolic pressure 80-89 mmHg; serum triglyceride level ≥ 150 mg/dL and/or total cholesterol level ≥ 200 mg/dL and/or high-density lipoprotein cholesterol level < 40 mg/dL in men and 50 mg/dL in women; serum glucose level 110–125 mg/dL; estimated glomerular filtration rate 60-89 ml/min/1.73 m2; levels of liver enzymes in liver function tests between 41-59 U/L, or with fatty liver disease but < 33% of affected hepatocytes; levels of oxidative stress biomarkers beyond the reference range of 95%; or problems with both sleep quality and psychological state.

Population Health Status

Engineers have proposed digital, handheld methods for many of those individuals to closely monitor their own health conditions, hoping to get need demands of both SHS groups and aging populations. Such a proposed healthcare system, which can provide self-monitoring of one's health status, early warning of disease, and even an instant report of the physiological signal analysis for individuals, is becoming more and more popular among many Chinese persons for whom it could be made available, in part because its theoretical foundations are based in traditional Chinese medicine.

SHS is associated with cardiovascular risk factors and contributes to the development of cardiovascular disease. SHS should be recognized in the health care system, especially in primary care. A correlation between SHS and systolic blood pressure, diastolic blood pressure, plasma glucose, total cholesterol and high-density lipoprotein (HDL) cholesterol among men, and a correlation between SHS and systolic blood pressure, diastolic blood pressure, total cholesterol, triglycerides and HDL cholesterol among women were found. The SHSQ-25 is a self-rated questionnaire of perceived health complaints, which can be used as a new instrument for predictive, preventive and personalized medicine (PPPM). An ongoing longitudinal SHS cohort survey (China Sub-optimal Health Cohort Study, COACS) consisting of 50,000 participants will provide a powerful health trial to use SHSQ-25 for its application to PPPM through patient stratification and therapy monitoring using innovative technologies of predictive diagnostics and prognosis: an effort of paradigm shift from reactive to predictive medicine.  one study also confirmed the association between chronic psychosocial stress and SHS, indicating that improving the psychosocial work environment may reduce SHS and then prevent chronic diseases effectively.  SHS is associated with endothelial dysfunction. Integration of suboptimal health status and endothelial dysfunction provides a novel tool to allow people to get a more holistic picture of both subjective and objective health measures, and also can be applied to routine screening for risks of cardiovascular diseases. To investigate the causative effect of SHS in non-communicable chronic diseases (NCD), China suboptimal health cohort study (COACS), a longitudinal study starting from 2013 was initiated.  Phase I of the study involved a cross-sectional survey aimed at identifying the risk/protective factors associated with SHS; and Phase II: a longitudinal yearly follow-up study investigating how SHS contributes to the incidence and pattern of NCD.

See also

 Behavioral medicine
 Chronic illness
 Global Forum for Health Research
 Health
 Health promotion
 Malaise
 Self-rated health
 Severity of illness
 Sickness behavior
 Stress (biology)

References

External links
 Hong Kong Connection - Being Sub-healthy
 Online test - Are you in a sub-health status?

Quality of life
Traditional Chinese medicine